Hamilton Moore is a Baptist theologian and lecturer.

Moore holds a Bachelor of Divinity, a Master of Theology, and a PhD. In 1990, Moore became Principal and New Testament tutor at the Irish Baptist College in Lisburn, Northern Ireland. He is also Adjunct Professor at Emanuel University in Oradea, Romania. Prior to that, he worked in pastoral and evangelistic ministry from 1968.

See also 

 Irish Baptist College
 Association of Baptist Churches in Ireland
 Baptist Theological Centre

References

External links 
 Irish Baptist College
 Association of Baptist Churches in Ireland
 Hamilton Moore on Irish Baptist College

People associated with the Irish Baptist College
Association of Baptist Churches in Ireland church members
Irish Christian theologians
Theologians from Northern Ireland
Systematic theologians
Association of Baptist Churches in Ireland pastor-teachers
Living people
Year of birth missing (living people)